Anatolian rock, or known as Turkish psychedelic rock, is a fusion of Turkish folk music and rock. It emerged during the mid-1960s, soon after rock groups became popular in Turkey. Most known members of this genre includes Turkish musicians such as Barış Manço, Cem Karaca, Erkin Koray, Selda Bağcan, Fikret Kızılok alongside bands such as Moğollar, Kurtalan Ekspres and 3 Hürel.

History and development

Background (1930s-1960s) 
Anatolian rock has a long history that dates back to the founding of the Turkish Republic decades ago. Modern Turkey's founding father, Atatürk, pushed extensive changes to build a national form of music from the early 1930s forward. Atatürk believed that the changes in music to be based on national and modern foundations and musicians should work on Turkish melodies and make them polyphonic according to the rules of Western harmonic music. As a result, Anatolian folk music began to spread and people began to listen Anatolian folk tunes instead of Ottoman music.

In the 1960s, rock & roll music began to be played and rock groups such as The Beatles, The Rolling Stones, Led Zeppelin, Yes, Status Quo and Omega became popular especially in Istanbul. It began to spread and became popular among the elite youth of the city. In Istanbul, high school and university students began forming their own bands and performing covers of rock'n roll and twist music in 1957. Students which will become famous singers later, such as Barış Manço from Galatasaray High School and Erkin Koray from German High School, they both performed at an amateur concert they have organized, which is known as the first rock'n roll concert of Turkey. Turkish singers such as Erol Büyükburç began to release English-language cover versions of American songs, as well as their own songs.

Golden age of Anatolian rock and Turkish psychedelic rock (1960s-1980s) 
In 1957, Turkish radio stations played surf rock by the Tornados or the Ventures and films with Elvis Presley and Bill Haley were shown in Turkish cinemas. This inspired musicians like Erkin Koray to start already in 1957 with cover versions of rock’n’roll tunes, using the new electric guitar. By the early 1960s, Turkish groups began to perform instrumentals, such as those by The Shadows and The Ventures. Although often locally popular performers, these Turkish groups were rarely recorded. The first original Turkish-language pop song was "Ayrılanlar İçin", released in 1964 by Timur Selçuk. Other singers also emerged, including Barış Manço, who first recorded in the early 1960s before later spearheading the growth of Turkish rock music in the 1970s with albums such as 2023 (1975) and become the father of Anatolian Rock. At the same time, Turkish society began to undergo significant cultural changes, including the growth of multi-party democracy in the region.

The domestic rock music scene in Turkey expanded rapidly in the mid- and late 1960s. In 1963, Erkin Koray published "One September Night" (Bir Eylül Akşamı) which is regarded as the first rock'n roll song in Turkish language and opened a new era, the Turkish psychedelic rock. From 1968 to about 1975, psychedelic rock became popular in Turkey, notably the work of guitarist Erkin Koray, regarded as a "hugely influential figure on the Istanbul music scene".  The band Moğollar are credited with "changing the landscape of Turkish rock by incorporating elements of Anatolian folk music," and, after recording in France as Les Mogols, named their musical genre Anadolu Pop. Another pioneer, Fikret Kızılok, combined the style of Anadolu Pop with overtly political lyrics, and experiments with electronic music.

Turkish musicians also regularly performed at competitive European music festivals. In 1964, Tülay German performed the song "Burçak Tarlası" at the Balkan Music Festival, in a bossa nova style, and became immediately popular. As a direct result, the newspaper Hürriyet organized a "Golden Microphone" (Altın Mikrofon) competition, to encourage the development of new songs in Turkish blending folk tune and Western style. This helped identify a new generation of musicians, including the groups Mavi Işıklar, Silüetler, and musicians Cem Karaca, Edip Akbayram, Selçuk Alagöz, and his sister Rana Alagöz. Finalists were awarded with an opportunity to record a 45rpm-disc, and a tour across the country. As a result, it caused people outside the big cities to be exposed to this genre.

The end of Anatolian rock era (1980) 
Anatolian Rock remained popular until the late 1970s. During these times, some musicians have taken a stand in support of the common people. One such person was Selda Bagcan. Musicians like Bagcan were able to speak directly to the people. For young, popular music became synonymous with leftist thinking, protests for greater equality, freedom and worker's rights. The left-wing views of these artists did not endear them to the authorities. By 1970s went on, economic recession and social unrest has arisen across Turkey and on 12 September 1980, military coup brought the Anatolian rock genre to an end. Left-wing rockers faced repression, while the gloomy political atmosphere boosted the popularity of the melancholic Arabesque genre during the 80s.

After the coup, rock musicians were banned from performing, many artists had to flee abroad such as Cem Karaca and some were imprisoned.

Era of Turkish rock (After 1990s) 
As other rock genres gained popularity in Turkey, Anatolian rock also began to diversify and Turkish rock that came out of this period, was far from its traditional roots, Anatolian style and has no connection with folk music.

In last decades, there has been a growth of Turkish rock bands such as  Duman, Mor ve Ötesi, Gece Yolcuları, Almora, Kurban, Kargo, Vega, Çilekeş, Redd, Gripin and maNga, the latter having won the "Best Rock Band" award in almost all polls in 2005. Besides, due to the Turkish migration to Germany, several Turkish-rooted bands also evolved in Germany – e.g.  In the 1980s as alternative groups: Ünlü (from 1981 on, at the beginning named Fahrstuhl) and the Trial (from 1985 on). The influences acting upon all these bands fall into a wide range of genres, from the Seattle Sound to heavy or doom metal and rapcore. Hence, Anatolian rock refers to a fusion of a wide selection of western rock subgenres with either a traditional Turkish sound or even rock music with Turkish lyrics. Such cultural fusion led the way for rock music to develop in Turkey.

There are also individual rock performers who have gained success such as Ayna, Murat Göğebakan, Haluk Levent, Şebnem Ferah, Barış Akarsu, Ogün Sanlısoy, Demir Demirkan, Hayko Cepkin, Aslı Gökyokuş, Nev, Aylin Aslım, Emre Aydın, Kıraç, Özlem Tekin and Teoman. By the end of the 1980s, several metal groups formed in Turkey such as Mezarkabul (Pentagram), and Diken.

2010s 
In late 2010s, some rock musicians and bands appeared that harmonizes the folk tunes with rock, such as Turkish singer Gaye Su Akyol, and bands like Palmiyeler, Ayyuka, Makas, Dutch Anatolian rock band Altın Gün and UK based Anatolian rock band Kit Sebastian. In 2014, Anatolian Rock Revival Project has started with the vision of preserving the culture of Anatolian rock and transferring it to future generations.

Related musicians and bands 
Key members of the Anatolian rock are Barış Manço, Cem Karaca, Erkin Koray, Selda Bağcan, Fikret Kızılok, Selçuk Alagöz, Edip Akbayram, Erol Büyükburç, Özdemir Erdoğan, Zafer Dilek, Tülay German, Bülent Ortaçgil, Alpay, Erkut Taçkın, Cahit Oben, Ersen Dinleten and most known bands are Moğollar, Kardaşlar, Apaşlar, Kaygısızlar, Ersen ve Dadaşlar, Haramiler, Harmoniler, Mavi Işıklar, Silüetler, Mazhar ve Fuat, 3 Hürel,  Kurtalan Ekspres, Hardal, Grup Çağrışım and Modern Folk Üçlüsü.

See also
 Anatolian blues

References and notes

 
20th-century music genres
Fusion music genres
Rock music by country
Turkish music